Courtenay is a commune in the Loiret department in north-central France.

History
Fortified by Athon, the first lord of Courtenay (Seigneur de Courtenay). The Noble house of Courtenay continued in France for many generations and eventually founded the Earls of Devon in England. It is the seat of the canton of Courtenay, which is part of the arrondissement of Montargis.

People
 Courtenay was the birthplace of Aristide Bruant and Pierre Tarin.
 Jacques-René Tenon, the famous surgeon, anatomist and influential 18th century analyst of hospital systems, spent his childhood in Courtenay.

See also
 Communes of the Loiret department

References

Communes of Loiret